Nedunchalai ( Highway) is a 2014 Tamil language thriller film written and directed by N. Krishna and produced by Aaju, C. Soundarajan and Dheeraj Kher. This film  features Aari Arujunan and Sshivada in the lead roles, with  Thambi Ramiah and Prashant Narayanan in another pivotal roles. The film released on 28 March 2014.

Plot
Set in 1988, the plot revolves around a dacoit, known as Tharpai Murugan who falls in love with a motel owner.

Cast

 Aari Arujunan as 'Tharpai' Murugan
 Sshivada as Manga
 Prashant Narayanan as Masanamuthu
 Thambi Ramiah as Master
 Salim Kumar as Maattu Sekhar
 Ashvin Raja as Soozhi
 Kishore DS as Young 'Tharpai' Murugan
 Kishore Kumar as Settu
 Ken Karunas as Hotel Assistant
 Thavasi as Murugan's Foster father (Chiyaan)
 Kannan Ponnaiya (Executive Producer)

Production
The film was announced in February 2012 with director N. Krishna, of Sillunu Oru Kaadhal (2006) fame, choosing to move on to his next venture instead of waiting for his long pending project Yen Ippadi Mayakkinai? to release. Aari Arujunan, who appeared in Rettaisuzhi (2010) and Maalai Pozhudhin Mayakathilaey (2012) was cast in the male lead role, with Sshivada, who has appeared in Malayalam films pairing opposite him. Prashant Narayanan was also signed on to play a pivotal role in the film (Tamil debut), as well as supporting actor Thambi Ramiah. The title was revealed to be Nedunchalai in March 2012 with the makers adamant that the title did not clash with another project titled Desiya Nedunchalai during the period.

Soundtrack 

The soundtrack album was composed by C. Sathya. The film's music was released on 1 July 2013 at an event where A. R. Rahman, who had collaborated with director Krishna in Sillunu Oru Kaadhal (2006), was invited as chief guest.

Critical reception
The film released to overall positive reviews. Baradwaj Rangan wrote, "In his previous film, Sillunu Oru Kaadhal, the director Krishna lost his way in trying to balance an intimate story with the overblown must-haves of a star-driven movie. He doesn’t make that mistake in Nedunchalai, which is toplined by Aari Arujunan and a terrific newcomer named Shivada", calling it "a rock-solid B-movie" and "one of the season’s happiest surprises". Sify wrote "The over-the-top characters along with their spontaneous dialogues make Nedunchalai worth a look. Despite its minor flaws, it makes-up with style and excellence". The Times of India gave the film 3 stars out of 5 and wrote, "From the characterization of the hero (right down to his costumes) to the tragic climax, the shadow of Ameer's Paruthiveeran looms large on Nedunchalai, and this is both its strength and weakness" and stated that "this film is certainly a surefooted effort that shows that this director can tell an engaging tale".
Behindwoods gave it 2.75 stars out of 5 and wrote "Although the movie has a few goodies to offer, it lacks those moments that can blow you over The film...doesn’t have too many twists, turns or humps that your eyes might want to look out for". In 2015 SIIMA,the film bagged two nominations including The Best Debut Actor for Aari and The Best Actor in a Negative Role for Prashanth Narayanan.

References

External links
 

2014 films
2010s Tamil-language films
2010s road movies
Indian road movies
Films scored by C. Sathya